The Compaq Center was formerly the name of the following locations:

 Lakewood Church Central Campus in Houston, Texas
 SAP Center in San Jose, California